= Aafrah =

Mountain in Lebanon

- Location within Lebanon

Highest point
- Prominence: 1,645 m (5,397 ft)
- Coordinates: 33°56′14″N 36°13′12″E

Geography
- Location: Lebanon

Aafrah is a mountain located near the Beqaa Valley in eastern Lebanon. It has an elevation of 1645 metres.
